Laureano Staropoli (born February 27, 1993) is an Argentine mixed martial artist (MMA) who  currently competes in the Welterweight division. He has previously competed for the Ultimate Fighting Championship (UFC).

Background
Staropoli begun training Taekwondo at the age of eight. After seeing Randy Couture fight, he started training mixed martial arts at the age of 17.

Mixed martial arts career

Early career 
Staropoli started his professional MMA career in 2013 and fought mainly in South America. He amassed a record of 7-1 prior joining UFC.

Ultimate Fighting Championship

Staropoli  made his UFC debut on November 17, 2018 at UFC Fight Night: Magny vs. Ponzinibbio against Hector Aldana. He won the fight via unanimous decision.

Staropoli faced Thiago Alves at UFC 237 on May 11, 2019. He won the fight via unanimous decision.

Staropoli was scheduled to face Alexey Kunchenko on August 10, 2019 in Montevideo, Uruguay. However, it was announced on July 29, 2019 that Staropoli was forced to pull out of the fight due to a broken nose and was replaced by Gilbert Burns. Kunchenko lost the fight via unanimous decision.

Staropoli faced Muslim Salikhov on October 26, 2019 at UFC on ESPN+ 20. He lost the fight via unanimous decision. 

Staropoli faced Tim Means on August 8, 2020 at UFC Fight Night 174. At the weigh-ins, Staropoli weighed in at 174.5 pounds, three and a half pounds over the welterweight non-title fight limit. The bout proceeded at a catchweight and Stropoli  was fined 20% of his purse, which went to Means. He lost the fight via unanimous decision.

Laureano, replacing injured Alessio Di Chirico, faced Roman Dolidze on June 5, 2021 at UFC Fight Night: Rozenstruik vs. Sakai. He lost the bout via unanimous decision.

Laureano was scheduled to face Jamie Pickett on October 9, 2021 at UFC Fight Night: Dern vs. Rodriguez. However, after one of Pickett's coaches tested positive for COVID-19, the bout was moved to October 23 at UFC Fight Night: Costa vs. Vettori. Laureano lost the fight via unanimous decision.

On November 2, 2021, it was announced that Staropoli was no longer on the UFC roster.

Post UFC 
Laureano made his first appearance post-UFC release on April 16, 2022 at Ares FC 5 against Carl Booth. He won the bout via unanimous decision.

Laureano faced Leonardo Damiani on November 3, 2022 at Ares FC 9, winning the bout via unanimous decision.

Personal life 
Staropoli was a police officer before being signed by UFC.

Championships and accomplishments
Ultimate Fighting Championship
Fight of the Night (One Time)

Mixed martial arts record

|-
|Win
|align=center|11–5
|Leonardo Damiani
|Decision (unanimous)
|Ares FC 9
|
|align=center|3
|align=center|5:00
|Paris, France
|
|-
|Win
|align=center|10–5
|Carl Booth
|Decision (unanimous)
|Ares FC 5
|
|align=center|3
|align=center|5:00
|Paris, France
|
|-
|Loss
|align=center|9–5
|Jamie Pickett
|Decision (unanimous)
|UFC Fight Night: Costa vs. Vettori 
|
|align=center|3
|align=center|5:00
|Las Vegas, Nevada, United States
|
|-
|Loss
|align=center|9–4
|Roman Dolidze
|Decision (unanimous)
|UFC Fight Night: Rozenstruik vs. Sakai 
|
|align=center|3
|align=center|5:00
|Las Vegas, Nevada, United States
|
|-
|Loss
|align=center|9–3
|Tim Means
|Decision (unanimous)
|UFC Fight Night: Lewis vs. Oleinik
|
|align=center|3
|align=center|5:00
|Las Vegas, Nevada, United States
|
|-
|Loss
|align=center|9–2
|Muslim Salikhov
|Decision (unanimous)
|UFC Fight Night: Maia vs. Askren 
|
|align=center|3
|align=center|5:00
|Kallang, Singapore
| 
|-
|Win
|align=center|9–1
|Thiago Alves
|Decision (unanimous)
|UFC 237
|
|align=center|3
|align=center|5:00
|Rio de Janeiro, Brazil
|
|-
|Win
|align=center|8–1
|Hector Aldana
|Decision (unanimous)
|UFC Fight Night: Magny vs. Ponzinibbio
|
|align=center|3
|align=center|5:00
|Buenos Aires, Argentina
|
|-
|Win
|align=center|7–1
|Carlos Alberto Bazan Rojas
|TKO (punches)
|Combate Cotas MMA 3
|
|align=center|2
|align=center|3:00
|Santa Cruz de la Sierra, Bolivia
|
|-
|Win
|align=center|6–1
|Sebastian Delgadillo
|TKO (punches)
|Combate Cotas MMA 2
|
|align=center|1
|align=center|3:45
|Santa Cruz de la Sierra, Bolivia
|
|-
|Win
|align=center|5–1
|Sebastian Muñoz
|KO (punches)
|Espartaco MMA 2
|
|align=center|1
|align=center|3:30
|Buenos Aires, Argentina 
|
|-
|Win
|align=center|4–1
|Sebastian Muñoz
|Submission (kimura)
|Ultimatum MMA: 2K9 Unlimited
|
|align=center|2
|align=center|3:00
|Buenos Aires, Argentina
|
|-
|Win
|align=center|3–1
|Ezequiel Miranda
|TKO (punches)
|Punishers 5
|
|align=center|1
|align=center|1:00
|Buenos Aires, Argentina 
|
|-
|Loss
|align=center|2–1
|Alejandro Ezequiel Coslovsky
|TKO (punches)
|Punishers 4
|
|align=center|1
|align=center|3:48
|Buenos Aires, Argentina
|
|-
|Win
|align=center|2–0
|Adrian Mazza Miranda
|TKO (punches)
|La Plata Fight Club
|
|align=center|1
|align=center|0:48
|Buenos Aires, Argentina
|
|-
|Win
|align=center|1–0
|William Castro
|Submission (armbar)
|Tavares Combat 7
|
|align=center|2
|align=center|4:16
|Buenos Aires, Argentina
|
|-

See also
List of male mixed martial artists

References

External links
 
 

1993 births
Heavyweight mixed martial artists
Mixed martial artists utilizing taekwondo
Mixed martial artists utilizing Brazilian jiu-jitsu
Living people
Argentine male mixed martial artists
Argentine male taekwondo practitioners
Argentine practitioners of Brazilian jiu-jitsu
Ultimate Fighting Championship male fighters
Sportspeople from La Plata